The Shire of Dandaragan is a local government area located in the Wheatbelt region of Western Australia, about  north of the state capital, Perth.

History

The Dandaraga Road District was created on 27 February 1890. It was renamed the Dandaragan Road District on 22 July 1932. On 1 July 1961, it became a shire following the enactment of the Local Government Act 1960, which reformed all remaining road districts into shires.

Until the late 1960s it was a sparsely populated agricultural shire, but the coastal towns of Jurien Bay and Cervantes and the popularity of The Pinnacles Desert with tourists have helped to fuel the Shire's growth. Originally the Shire's main administration centre was in the small town of Dandaragan, however due to the disproportionate population growth in the town of Jurien Bay the administration was relocated there in 2003.

Wards
On 22 May 1971, the shire was divided into Coastal, Central, North and South wards, and its representation increased from seven to nine councillors. Over time, the Coastal ward increased in size, and ultimately on 2 May 1987, the ward was abolished and two new wards, Cervantes and Jurien, were created. By 3 November 1989, the following wards existed:

 Jurien Ward (three councillors)
 Cervantes Ward (two councillors)
 Badgingarra Ward (two councillors) (formerly North Ward)
 Dandaragan Ward (three councillors) (formerly South Ward)

On 7 May 2005, the shire was redivided into two wards:

 North Ward (five councillors)
 South Ward (four councillors)
By the 2009 Council elections all wards had been abolished and nine councillors represent the whole shire.

Towns and localities
The towns and localities of the Shire of Dandaragan with population and size figures based on the most recent Australian census:

Population

Heritage-listed places
As of 2023, 98 places are heritage-listed in the Shire of Dandaragan, of which none are on the State Register of Heritage Places.

References

External links
 

 
Dandaragan